Sfinge has been borne by at least two ships of the Italian Navy and may refer to:

 , a  launched in 1943.
 , a  launched in 1987 and stricken in 2017. 

Italian Navy ship names